Francis Zavier Ngannou (born 5 September 1986) is a Cameroonian-French professional mixed martial artist who most recently competed in the Heavyweight division in the Ultimate Fighting Championship (UFC), where he was the reigning UFC Heavyweight Champion at the time of his departure from the promotion.

Early life and education
Ngannou was born and raised in the village of Batié, Cameroon. He lived in poverty and had little formal education growing up. Ngannou's parents divorced when he was six years old, and he was sent to live with his aunt. At 10 years old, Ngannou started working in a sand quarry in Batié because of a lack of funds. As a youngster, he was approached by several gangs in his village to join them. However, Ngannou refused and instead decided to use his father's negative reputation as a street fighter as motivation to do something positive and pursue boxing.

At the age of 22, Ngannou began training in boxing, despite the initial reluctance of his family. After training for a year, Ngannou stopped training due to an illness. He did various odd jobs to make ends meet, until at the age of 26, he decided to head to Paris, France, to pursue professional boxing. However upon reaching Europe, he was jailed for two months in Spain for illegally crossing the border. After Ngannou reached Paris, he had no money, no friends, and no place to live. After living homeless on the streets of Paris, he met Francis Carmont who introduced him to Fernand Lopez and the MMA factory. Being a fan of Mike Tyson, Ngannou was originally interested in learning how to box but Lopez saw his potential in MMA and convinced him to try MMA instead. Lopez gave Ngannou some MMA gear and allowed him to train and sleep at the gym for no cost thus starting Ngannou's MMA career.

Reflecting on his journey across continents and his decision to become an MMA fighter, Ngannou said:

Mixed martial arts career

Early career
Ngannou started his MMA career in November 2013 and fought mostly in the French promotion 100% Fight, as well as other regional promotions in Europe. He compiled a record of 5–1 before signing with the UFC.

Ultimate Fighting Championship
Ngannou made his UFC debut against fellow newcomer Luis Henrique on 19 December 2015, at UFC on Fox 17. He won the fight via knockout in the second round.

Ngannou next faced UFC newcomer Curtis Blaydes on 10 April 2016, at UFC Fight Night 86. He won the fight via TKO, due to doctor stoppage at the end of the second round.

In his next bout, Ngannou faced another newcomer in Bojan Mihajlović on 23 July 2016, at UFC on Fox 20. He won the fight via TKO in the first round.  Ngannou then faced Anthony Hamilton on 9 December 2016, at UFC Fight Night 102. He won the fight by submission in the first round, and earned his first UFC Performance of the Night bonus.

Ngannou faced Andrei Arlovski on 28 January 2017, at UFC on Fox 23. He won the fight via TKO in the first round. The win also earned Ngannou his second Performance of the Night bonus.

Ngannou was expected to face Junior dos Santos on 9 September 2017, at UFC 215. However, on 18 August, Dos Santos was pulled from the match after being notified of a potential USADA violation. In turn, Ngannou was removed from the card after promotion officials deemed that a suitable opponent could not be arranged.

In the highest profile fight of his career, Ngannou faced veteran Alistair Overeem on 2 December 2017, at UFC 218. He won the fight via knockout in the first round. This knockout has been labeled as one of the greatest and most brutal knockouts of all time. Following the bout, Ngannou signed a new, eight-fight contract with the UFC.

Ngannou faced Stipe Miocic for the UFC Heavyweight Championship on 20 January 2018, at UFC 220. He lost the fight via unanimous decision.

Ngannou faced Derrick Lewis on 7 July 2018, at UFC 226. He lost the fight via unanimous decision. The fight was heavily criticized by the media and the fans for the lack of offence from both competitors and was labeled as a "snoozefest".

Ngannou faced Curtis Blaydes in a rematch on 24 November 2018, in the main event at UFC Fight Night 141 He won the fight via TKO early into the first round. The win also earned him a Performance of the Night bonus.

Ngannou headlined the UFC's inaugural event on ESPN, UFC on ESPN 1 against Cain Velasquez on 17 February 2019. He won the fight via knockout in the first round.

Ngannou faced Junior dos Santos on 29 June 2019, at UFC on ESPN 3. He won the fight via technical knockout in the first round. This fight earned him the Performance of the Night award.

Ngannou was scheduled to face Jairzinho Rozenstruik on 28 March 2020, at UFC on ESPN: Ngannou vs. Rozenstruik. Due to the COVID-19 pandemic, the event was eventually postponed . The pair was rescheduled to meet at 18 April 2020, at UFC 249. However, on 9 April, Dana White, the president of the UFC announced that the event was postponed and the bout eventually took place on 9 May 2020. Ngannou won via knockout just 20 seconds into the first round. This win earned him the Performance of the Night award.

UFC Heavyweight Champion

Miocic vs. Ngannou II
A rematch of the bout between Miocic and Ngannou for the UFC Heavyweight Championship took place on 27 March 2021, at UFC 260. Ngannou won the fight via knockout in the second round. This win earned him the Performance of the Night award.

Ngannou vs. Gane
Ngannou faced the Interim UFC Heavyweight Champion Ciryl Gane for his first title defense on 22 January 2022, at UFC 270. He injured knee ligaments three and a half weeks before the fight. Ngannou won the fight by unanimous decision, the first decision win of his career.

Departure
On January 14, 2023, the UFC Heavyweight Championship was stripped from Ngannou after he and the UFC could not come to terms on a new contract. Ngannou's contract expired in mid-December, and after the two parties couldn't reach an agreement, the UFC opted to waive its one-year matching rights clause, making Ngannou an unrestricted free agent. In an interview with Ariel Helwani, Ngannou stated that he had requested health insurance, the ability to have sponsorships for all UFC fighters, and to have a fighter advocate present during all fighter contract negotiations. When his requests were denied, Ngannou chose not to re-sign with the UFC, making him the first reigning champion to leave the UFC since BJ Penn in 2004.

Since Ngannou's departure from the UFC, Ngannou has openly admitted to wanting to start a boxing career and is currently targeting boxing matches with both Deontay Wilder and Tyson Fury.

Personal life
Ngannou speaks several languages including Ngemba, French, and English. He learned English after joining the UFC.

Philanthropy
The Francis Ngannou Foundation runs the first MMA gym in Cameroon, aiming to offer facilities for young people to have a place to train.

Filmography

Films

Championships and accomplishments
Ultimate Fighting Championship
 UFC Heavyweight Championship (One time)
 One successful title defense
 First Cameroon-born UFC champion
 Performance of the Night (Six times)  
World record for the hardest punch
 Bleacher Report
 2017 Knockout of the Year vs. Alistair Overeem
 ESPN
 2017 Knockout of the Year vs. Alistair Overeem
 Pundit Arena
 2017 Knockout of the Year vs. Alistair Overeem
 MMA Fighting / SB Nation
 2017 Knockout of the Year vs. Alistair Overeem
 2017 Breakthrough Fighter of the Year
 MMAjunkie.com
2017 Knockout of the Year vs. Alistair Overeem
2021 March Knockout of the Month vs. Stipe Miocic
MMADNA.nl
2017 Knockout of the Year.
World MMA Awards
 2017 Knockout of the Year vs. Alistair Overeem at UFC 218

Mixed martial arts record

|-
|Win
|align=center|17–3
|Ciryl Gane
|Decision (unanimous)
|UFC 270
|
|align=center|5
|align=center|5:00
|Anaheim, California, United States
|
|-
|Win
|align=center|16–3
|Stipe Miocic
|KO (punch)
|UFC 260
|
|align=center|2
|align=center|0:52
|Las Vegas, Nevada, United States
|
|-
|Win
|align=center|15–3
|Jairzinho Rozenstruik
|KO (punches)
|UFC 249
|
|align=center|1
|align=center|0:20
|Jacksonville, Florida, United States
|
|-
|Win
|align=center|14–3
|Junior dos Santos
|TKO (punches) 
|UFC on ESPN: Ngannou vs. dos Santos
|
|align=center|1
|align=center|1:11
|Minneapolis, Minnesota, United States	
|
|-
| Win
|align=center|13–3
|Cain Velasquez
|KO (punches)
|UFC on ESPN: Ngannou vs. Velasquez
|
|align=center|1
|align=center|0:26
|Phoenix, Arizona, United States
|
|-
| Win
|align=center|12–3
|Curtis Blaydes
|TKO (punches)
|UFC Fight Night: Blaydes vs. Ngannou 2
|
|align=center|1
|align=center|0:45
|Beijing, China
|
|-
|Loss
|align=center|11–3
|Derrick Lewis
|Decision (unanimous)
|UFC 226
|
|align=center|3
|align=center|5:00
|Las Vegas, Nevada, United States
|
|-
|Loss
|align=center|11–2
|Stipe Miocic
|Decision (unanimous)
|UFC 220
|
|align=center|5
|align=center|5:00
|Boston, Massachusetts, United States
|
|-
| Win
|align=center|11–1
|Alistair Overeem
|KO (punch)
|UFC 218
|
|align=center|1
|align=center|1:42
|Detroit, Michigan, United States
|
|-
| Win
|align=center|10–1
|Andrei Arlovski
|TKO (punches)
|UFC on Fox: Shevchenko vs. Peña
|
|align=center|1
|align=center|1:32
|Denver, Colorado, United States
|
|-
| Win
|align=center|9–1
|Anthony Hamilton
|Submission (kimura)
|UFC Fight Night: Lewis vs. Abdurakhimov
|
|align=center|1
|align=center|1:57
|Albany, New York, United States
|
|-
| Win
|align=center|8–1
|Bojan Mihajlović
|TKO (punches)
|UFC on Fox: Holm vs. Shevchenko
|
|align=center|1
|align=center|1:34
|Chicago, Illinois, United States
|
|-
| Win
|align=center|7–1
|Curtis Blaydes
|TKO (doctor stoppage)
|UFC Fight Night: Rothwell vs. dos Santos
|
|align=center|2
|align=center|5:00
|Zagreb, Croatia
|
|-
| Win
|align=center|6–1
|Luis Henrique
|KO (punch)
|UFC on Fox: dos Anjos vs. Cowboy 2
|
|align=center|2
|align=center|2:53
|Orlando, Florida, United States
|
|-
| Win
|align=center|5–1
|William Baldutti
|TKO (punches)
|KHK MMA National Tryouts: Finale 2015
|
|align=center|2
|align=center|1:22
|Madinat Isa, Bahrain
|
|-
| Win
|align=center|4–1
|Luc Ngeleka
|Submission (guillotine choke)
|SHC 10: Carvalho vs. Belo 
|
|style="text-align:center;"|1
|style="text-align:center;"|0:44
|Geneva, Switzerland
|
|-
|Win
|align=center|3–1
|Nicolas Specq
|Submission (arm-triangle choke)
|rowspan=2| 100% Fight 20: Comeback
|rowspan=2| 
|align=center|1
|align=center|2:10
|rowspan=2| Levallois, France
|
|-
| Win
|align=center|2–1
|Bilal Tahtahi
|KO (punch)
|align=center|1
|align=center|3:58
|
|-
|Loss
|align=center|1–1
|Zoumana Cisse
|Decision (unanimous)
|100% Fight: Contenders 21
|
|align=center|2
|align=center|5:00
|Paris, France
|
|-
| Win
|align=center|1–0
|Rachid Benzina
|Submission (armbar)
|100% Fight: Contenders 20
|
|align=center|1
|align=center|1:44
|Paris, France
|

Pay-per-view bouts

See also

 List of current UFC fighters
 List of male mixed martial artists

References

External links

People from Centre Region (Cameroon)
Living people
Heavyweight mixed martial artists
Mixed martial artists utilizing boxing
Cameroonian male mixed martial artists
French male mixed martial artists
Cameroonian emigrants to France
Ultimate Fighting Championship male fighters
Ultimate Fighting Championship champions
1986 births